In probability theory, the conditional expectation, conditional expected value, or conditional mean of a random variable is its expected value – the value it would take “on average” over an arbitrarily large number of occurrences – given that a certain set of "conditions" is known to occur. If the random variable can take on only a finite number of values, the “conditions” are that the variable can only take on a subset of those values. More formally, in the case when the random variable is defined over a discrete probability space, the "conditions" are a partition of this probability space.

Depending on the context, the conditional expectation can be either a random variable or a function. The random variable is denoted  analogously to conditional probability.

Examples

Example 1: Dice rolling 
Consider the roll of a fair  and let A = 1 if the number is even (i.e., 2, 4, or 6) and A = 0 otherwise. Furthermore, let B = 1 if the number is prime (i.e., 2, 3, or 5) and B = 0 otherwise.

Example 2: Rainfall data 
Suppose we have daily rainfall data (mm of rain each day) collected by a weather station on every day of the ten–year (3652-day) period from January 1, 1990, to December 31, 1999.  The unconditional expectation of rainfall for an unspecified day is the average of the rainfall amounts for those 3652 days. The conditional expectation of rainfall for an otherwise unspecified day known to be (conditional on being) in the month of March, is the average of daily rainfall over all 310 days of the ten–year period that falls in March. And the conditional expectation of rainfall conditional on days dated March 2 is the average of the rainfall amounts that occurred on the ten days with that specific date.

History 
The related concept of conditional probability dates back at least to Laplace, who calculated conditional distributions.  It was Andrey Kolmogorov who, in 1933, formalized it using the Radon–Nikodym theorem.  In works of Paul Halmos and Joseph L. Doob from 1953, conditional expectation was generalized to its modern definition using sub-σ-algebras.

Definitions

Conditioning on an event 
of  given  is

Note that if , the conditional expectation is undefined due to the division by zero.

Discrete random variables 
the conditional expectation of  given  is

Note that conditioning on a discrete random variable is the same as conditioning on the corresponding event:
 
where  is the set .

Continuous random variables 
Let  and  be continuous random variables with joint density

's density

and conditional density  of  given the event 
The conditional expectation of  given  is

When the denominator is zero, the expression is undefined.

Note that conditioning on a continuous random variable is not the same as conditioning on the event  as it was in the discrete case. For a discussion, see Conditioning on an event of probability zero. Not respecting this distinction can lead to contradictory conclusions as illustrated by the Borel-Kolmogorov paradox.

L2 random variables 
In its full generality, conditional expectation is developed without this assumption, see below under Conditional expectation with respect to a sub-σ-algebra. The  theory is, however, considered more intuitive and admits important generalizations.
In the context of  random variables, conditional expectation is also called regression.
 
 with mean  and variance .
The expectation  minimizes the mean squared error:
.

, the result will be a function . Let  be a random vector. The conditional expectation  is a measurable function such that
.

Note that unlike , the conditional expectation  is not generally unique: there may be multiple minimizers of the mean squared error.

Uniqueness 

Example 1: Consider the case where  is the constant random variable that's always 1.
Then the mean squared error is minimized by any function of the form

Example 2: Consider the case where  is the 2-dimensional random vector . Then clearly

In the context of linear regression, this lack of uniqueness is called multicollinearity.

In the first example, the pushforward measure is a Dirac distribution at 1. In the second it is concentrated on the "diagonal" , so that any set not intersecting it has measure 0.

Existence 

It can be shown that

is a closed subspace of the Hilbert space .
By the Hilbert projection theorem, the necessary and sufficient condition for
 to be a minimizer is that for all  in  we have
.
This orthogonality condition, applied to the indicator functions ,

Connections to regression 

The conditional expectation is often approximated in applied mathematics and statistics due to the difficulties in analytically calculating it, and for interpolation.

The Hilbert subspace
 
Examples of this are decision tree regression when  is required to be a simple function, linear regression when  is required to be affine, etc.

These generalizations of conditional expectation come at the cost of many of its properties no longer holding.
For example, let 
If  does not contain the constant functions, the tower property 

will not hold.

In this case
it can be shown that the conditional expectation is equivalent to linear regression:

for coefficients  described in Multivariate normal distribution#Conditional distributions.

Conditional expectation with respect to a sub-σ-algebra 

Consider the following:
  is a probability space.
  is a random variable on that probability space with finite expectation.

for each .

As noted in the  discussion, this condition is equivalent to saying that the residual  is orthogonal to the indicator functions :

Existence 

implies

Thus, we have 

where the derivatives are Radon–Nikodym derivatives of measures.

Conditional expectation with respect to a random variable 
Consider, in addition to the above,
 A measurable space , and
 A random variable .

The conditional expectation of  given  is defined by applying the above construction on the σ-algebra generated by :
.

By the Doob-Dynkin lemma, there exists a function  such that
.

Discussion 

 This is not a constructive definition; we are merely given the required property that a conditional expectation must satisfy.
 Uniqueness can be shown to be almost sure: that is, versions of the same conditional expectation will only differ on a set of probability zero.
 The σ-algebra  controls the "granularity" of the conditioning.  A conditional expectation  over a finer (larger) σ-algebra  retains information about the probabilities of a larger class of events.  A conditional expectation over a coarser (smaller) σ-algebra averages over more events.

Conditional probability 

.
It can be shown that they form a Markov kernel, that is, for almost all ,
 is a probability measure.

The Law of the unconscious statistician is then
.
This shows that conditional expectations are, like their unconditional counterparts, integrations,
against a conditional measure.

General Definition 
In full generality, consider:
 A probability space .
 A Banach space .
 A Bochner integrable random variable .
 A sub-σ-algebra .

The conditional expectation of  given  is the up to a -nullset unique and integrable -valued -measurable random variable  satisfying

for all . 

Basic properties 
All the following formulas are to be understood in an almost sure sense.  The σ-algebra  could be replaced by a random variable , i.e. .

 Pulling out independent factors:

Let .

Thus the definition of conditional expectation is satisfied by the constant random variable , as desired. 

 Stability:
 If  is -measurable, then .

For each  we have , or equivalently

And this implies  almost everywhere. 

 In particular, for sub-σ-algebras  we have .
 If Z is a random variable, then .  In its simplest form, this says .
 Pulling out known factors:
 If  is -measurable, then .

All random variables here are assumed without loss of generality to be non-negative.

Fix  and let . Then for any 

Hence  almost everywhere. 

Any simple function is a finite linear combination of indicator functions. By linearity the above property holds for simple functions: if  is a simple function then .

Now let  be -measurable.

Also, since , the sequence  converges monotonically and pointwise to 

Combining the special case proved for simple functions, the definition of conditional expectation, and deploying the monotone convergence theorem:

This holds for all , whence  almost everywhere. 

 If Z is a random variable, then .
 Law of total expectation: .
 Tower property:
 For sub-σ-algebras  we have .
 A special case  recovers the Law of total expectation: .
 A special case is when Z is a -measurable random variable. Then  and thus .
 For random variables  we have .
 For random variables  we have .
 Positivity: If  then .
 Monotonicity: If  then .
 Monotone convergence: If  then .
 Fatou's lemma: If  then .
 Jensen's inequality: If  is a convex function, then .
 Conditional variance: Using the conditional expectation we can define, by analogy with the definition of the variance as the mean square deviation from the average, the conditional variance
 Definition: 
Algebraic formula for the variance: 
 Law of total variance: .
 Conditional expectation as -projection: If  are in the Hilbert space of square-integrable real random variables (real random variables with finite second moment) then
(This allows to define and prove the existence of the conditional expectation based on the Hilbert projection theorem.)
 the mapping  is self-adjoint: 
 Conditioning is a contractive projection of Lp spaces .  I.e.,  for any p ≥ 1.
 Doob's conditional independence property: If  are conditionally independent given , then  (equivalently).

See also

Conditioning (probability)
Disintegration theorem
Doob–Dynkin lemma
Factorization lemma
Joint probability distribution
Non-commutative conditional expectation

Probability laws 

 Law of total cumulance (generalizes the other three)
 Law of total expectation
 Law of total probability
 Law of total variance

Notes

References 

 William Feller, An Introduction to Probability Theory and its Applications, vol 1, 1950, page 223
 Paul A. Meyer, Probability and Potentials, Blaisdell Publishing Co., 1966, page 28
 , pages 67–69

External links 
 

Conditional probability
Statistical theory